Elisavet Protopapas (born 23 July 1999) is a Greek water polo player for California Golden Bears and the Greece women's national water polo team.

She participated at the 2018 Women's European Water Polo Championship.

References

1999 births
Living people
Greek female water polo players
Expatriate water polo players
Greek expatriates in the United States
California Golden Bears men's water polo players
Water polo players at the 2015 European Games
European Games medalists in water polo
European Games bronze medalists for Greece
21st-century Greek women